The Hot Hits Live from LA was an Australian radio program on the Today Network, Southern Cross Media's Hit Music Stream, Ace Radio Network's Hit Music Stream (except TRFM) and other stations around Australia.

History 
Kyle and Jackie O were the inaugural hosts of the show until 28 November 2009.

In November 2009, it was announced that Günsberg would replace Kyle and Jackie O as host of a new show, "The Hot Hits Live from LA", from Los Angeles. Kyle and Jackie O presented their final show on 28 November, with Günsberg taking over on 6 December with guests Snoop Dogg and Jared Leto.

In December 2012, Andrew Günsberg announced that he would be leaving the show after hosting the show for three years. Maude Garrett was announced as his replacement in January 2013 and Dave Styles signed on to co-host in late January.

In January 2015, Southern Cross Austereo announced the end of The Hot Hits Live from LA with the show replaced by "Planet Vevo", hosted by Dan & Maz.

References

External links
 
 Authentic Entertainment

Australian radio programs
Music chart shows